Robert Fleming may refer to:
 Robert Fleming (author), American journalist and writer of mysteries, horror, and erotic fiction
 Robert Fleming (composer) (1921–1976), Canadian composer
 Robert Fleming (financier) (1845–1933), Scottish financier and founder of the merchant bank Robert Fleming & Co
 Robert Fleming (footballer) (1860–?), Scottish footballer
 Robert E. Fleming (born 1936), American literary critic and university professor
 Robert John Fleming (1907–1984), American soldier and Governor of the Panama Canal Zone
 Robert D. Fleming (1903–1994), Pennsylvania politician
 Robert John Fleming (Canadian politician) (1854–1925), Mayor of Toronto, Canada
 Robert Loren Fleming (born 1956), American comic book writer
 Robert Fleming the elder (1630–1694), Scottish Calvinist minister and theologian
 Robert Fleming the younger (c. 1660–1716), Scottish presbyterian minister, son of Robert Fleming the elder
 Robert Alexander Fleming (1862–1947), Scottish pathologist and medical author
 Rob Fleming (born 1971), Canadian politician
 Bob Fleming, fictional character in the British comedy sketch show The Fast Show

See also 

Robert Flemming (died 1483), dean of Lincoln
 Robert F. Flemming Jr. (1839–1919), American inventor and sailor
Robert Fleming Gourlay (1778–1863), writer, reformer and agriculturalist
Robert Fleming Rich, Republican representative, U.S.A.